Major General Alexander Taylor CB, (born 30 August 1970) is a senior British Army officer. He is currently serving as Director, Army Legal Services Branch.

Taylor was educated at Hurstpierpoint College and Durham University (BSc), followed by Cambridge University (LLM). Before joining the military he was a solicitor with City of London firm Wilde Sapte.

References

People educated at Hurstpierpoint College
Alumni of Durham University
British Army generals
Living people
1970 births